Goodbye South, Goodbye is a 1996 crime drama film directed by Hou Hsiao-hsien. The film had its premiere at the Cannes Film Festival on 12 May 1996.

Plot
Gao (Jack Kao) rides the train to Pinghsi to set up a 10-day gambling den with his friend Hsi (Hsi Hsiang). He takes his acolyte Flatty (Lim Giong) and Pretzel (Annie Shizuka Inoh), Flatty's girlfriend, who works part-time in a night club. Gao's girlfriend Ying (Hsu Kuei-Ying) works in the same night club as Pretzel and doesn't like the people around Gao, finding them dangerous. Gao has already made a deal with Hsi to invest in a nightclub in Shanghai, but Ying doesn't want him to go. Instead, she wants him to stay in Taiwan to open a restaurant. A succession of get-rich-quick schemes leads them to the brink of disaster. Throughout the course of the film the unsavory alliance between the underworld and the political elite emerges.

Cast
Jack Kao as Gao
Lim Giong as Flat Head
Annie Shizuka Inoh as Pretzel
Hsi Hsiang as Hsi
Hsu Kuei-Ying as Ying
Lei Ming as Gao's father
Lien Pi-tung as Tung
Kao Ming as Ming
Vicky Wei as Hui

Production

Soundtrack
The film's soundtrack was released in Taiwan by Magic Stone in 1996, as well as in Japan by Soundtrack Listeners Communications on March 21, 1997.

Reception
Goodbye South, Goodbye was entered into the 1996 Cannes Film Festival, but lost to Secrets & Lies.

Critical response
The film was chosen along with The Bridges of Madison County and Carlito's Way as the best film of the 1990s by Cahiers du cinéma. Director Luca Guadagnino also listed it as one of his 10 favorite films in the 2012 Sight & Sound poll.

References

External links

1996 films
1996 crime drama films
Taiwanese crime drama films
Hokkien-language films
1990s Mandarin-language films
Films directed by Hou Hsiao-hsien
Films with screenplays by Chu T’ien-wen